Red clover vein mosaic virus (RCVMV) is a plant pathogenic virus.

External links
ICTVdB - The Universal Virus Database: Red clover vein mosaic virus
Family Groups - The Baltimore Method

Carlaviruses
Viral plant pathogens and diseases